Chung Cheng High School (Yishun) (CCHY) is a co-educational government-aided secondary school in Yishun, Singapore. It is an affiliated school and a former branch school of Chung Cheng High School (Main).

History 
With the start of enrolment of female students by Chung Cheng High School in 1947, student population increased significantly throughout the post war years, and the initial premise of the school at River Valley became increasingly overcrowded. In August 1947, Lin Shi Wan, Chairman of the Management Board, set up a new campus on a plot of land at Goodman Road, naming the campus Chung Cheng High School (Main) while the original school at Kim Yam road functioned as a branch school, renamed as Chung Cheng High School (Branch).

In May 1969, the School Management Committee of Chung Cheng High School and The Singapore Hokkien Huay Kuan agreed on an exchange of campus land of Chung Cheng High School (Branch) with a newly built Kong Hwa Wing building adjacent to Kong Hwa School. Chung Cheng High (Branch) was relocated to 339 Guillemard Road, while the original premises at 60 Kim Yam Rd becoming part of the extension for the campus of Nan Chiau Girls' High School.
In 1981, following unification of language streams by the Ministry of education, the school began to convert to English stream classes. In the late 1980s, there was an urgent need to upgrade the school facilities and to move to a spacious location. As rebuilding the school on the current 0.6 hectare land was not feasible, the school opted for relocation to a more spacious better-equipped facility.

Between January 2002 and 2005, the school operated at two campuses, the Guillemard site and the holding school at Sembawang Drive. Chung Cheng High School (Branch) was renamed as Chung Cheng High School (Yishun) with effect from January 2006.

Principal

Identity and culture

Uniform and attire 
Chung Cheng High (Yishun) adopts the same uniform with Chung Cheng High (Main), with minor differentiating features. The uniform consists of a white studded shirt with eight-pleated skirts for female students, shorts for male students in lower secondary levels, or long pants for boys in upper secondary levels. The studded shirt features two chest pockets and seven plastic buttons in total, two the shoulders, two on each pocket and three down the front, a distinct feature of its heritage. The school badge is worn with the uniform, with the exception of councillors which features a distinct school badge and a name tag. A blue school tie is worn during Tuesday assembly and during important school functions.

Affiliations 
Chung Cheng High School (Yishun) is an affiliated school and a former branch school of Chung Cheng High School (Main). Both schools are affiliated to Nanyang Junior College.

Co-curricular activities 
Chung Cheng High School (Yishun) offers 20 Co-Curricular Activities (or CCA). Every student in Chung Cheng High School (Yishun) is expected to participate in a CCA from one of the four domains, namely: Clubs & Societies, Physical Sports, Uniformed Groups and Visual & Performing Arts.

Gallery

References

External links

Official Website
Chung Cheng High School Alumni Association (Youth Wing)

Secondary schools in Singapore
Yishun
Educational institutions established in 1947
1947 establishments in Singapore
Schools in Yishun